Herbert Höfl (born 1 March 1941) is a German speed skater. He competed at the 1964 Winter Olympics and the 1968 Winter Olympics.

References

1941 births
Living people
German male speed skaters
Olympic speed skaters of the United Team of Germany
Olympic speed skaters of West Germany
Speed skaters at the 1964 Winter Olympics
Speed skaters at the 1968 Winter Olympics
Sportspeople from Munich
20th-century German people